Conemaugh Township is the name of some places in the U.S. state of Pennsylvania:
Conemaugh Township, Cambria County, Pennsylvania
Conemaugh Township, Indiana County, Pennsylvania
Conemaugh Township, Somerset County, Pennsylvania

Pennsylvania township disambiguation pages